Vladimer Khinchegashvili (born April 18, 1991) is a Georgian freestyle wrestler who competes in 55–61 kg categories. He won a silver medal at the 2012 Olympics and a gold at the 2016 Olympics. He also won a world title in 2015 and European titles in 2014, 2016 and 2017. In 2015, he was selected as Male Georgian Athlete of the Year by the Georgian Ministry of Sport and Youth Affairs.

Career

2012 Summer Olympics 
At the 2012 Summer Olympics, Khinchegashvili beat Ibrahim Farag in the first round, before beating Radoslav Velikov, Amit Kumar and Shinichi Yumoto.  In the Olympic final, he lost to Dzhamal Otarsultanov.

Following his medal at the 2012 Olympics, Khinchegashvili won silver at the 2014 World Championships. Khinchegashvili followed this by winning the gold medal at the 2015 World Championships. That year, he and Belarusian wrestler, Vladislav Andreev, were disqualified from the European Games, after their semifinal match descended into a brawl.

2016 Summer Olympics 
At the 2016 Summer Olympics, Khinchegashvili received a bye in the first round, before beating Nurislam Sanayev in the second round.  He beat Haji Aliyev and Vladimir Dubov before beating Rei Higuchi to win Olympic gold.

In 2017, he won a bronze medal at the World Championships.

References

External links

 
 
 European Wrestling Council official website

Living people
1991 births
People from Gori, Georgia
Olympic wrestlers of Georgia (country)
Wrestlers at the 2012 Summer Olympics
Wrestlers at the 2016 Summer Olympics
Olympic silver medalists for Georgia (country)
Olympic gold medalists for Georgia (country)
Olympic medalists in wrestling
Medalists at the 2012 Summer Olympics
Medalists at the 2016 Summer Olympics
Wrestlers at the 2015 European Games
Male sport wrestlers from Georgia (country)
World Wrestling Championships medalists
Recipients of the Presidential Order of Excellence
Wrestlers at the 2019 European Games
European Games medalists in wrestling
European Games silver medalists for Georgia (country)
European Wrestling Championships medalists
World Wrestling Champions